Army Public School, Shankar Vihar is a school in Delhi Cantonment, Shankar Vihar, Delhi. It is a branch of the AWES-controlled Indian Army Public Schools. The school is affiliated with the Central Board of Secondary Education 
 

Army Public School, Shankar Vihar is committed to the multi-faceted growth and upliftment of students by offering them not merely the inputs that are necessary for excellent performance in national level examinations, but also a more general education designed to enhance maturity, breadth of vision and versatility of personality. Towards this end, co-curricular and sports activities play a large part.

The students in the school are divided into four houses:

Inception
The foundation stone of the school was laid on 17 August 2005 by Adjutant General Lt Gen Mohinder Singh PVSM, UYSM, AVSM. After almost two years and six months, the school, with full staffing and student enrollment, was functional from 9 April 2007. Mrs. Malini Narayan, the principal, joined the school on 22 April 2007.

The school holds an Annual Competitive Event "Expressions". Through Expressions, many schools in Delhi come together to compete in categories including Graffiti Painting, Hindi Play and skit, poems, song, Web Crawling, Folk Singing, Best Out of Waste and Band Competitions.

Infrastructure and academics
The school is divided into three wings - 
Primary Wing
Secondary Wing
Senior Secondary Wing

The school has an air-conditioned auditorium, a well-maintained library, chemistry/physics/biology labs and music, dance and art rooms. The Official School band is Kaleidocycle. For sports, the school provides 4 Basketball courts, 2 Tennis courts, 2 Handball Courts and a Football Field. Taekwondo and NCC are also available.

The school offers the following streams after 10th Grade -

Achievements
On 18 November 2016, the school bagged the second prize for overall academic performance in large category school

References

External links
 APS SV Official Site

Schools in Delhi